Society Hill Historic District may refer to:
 Society Hill Historic District (Philadelphia, Pennsylvania), listed on the NRHP in Pennsylvania
 Society Hill Historic District (Portage, Wisconsin), listed on the NRHP in Wisconsin